Federico Castaing (born 28 May 1960) is an Argentine equestrian. He competed in two events at the 1996 Summer Olympics.

References

External links
 

1960 births
Living people
Argentine male equestrians
Olympic equestrians of Argentina
Equestrians at the 1996 Summer Olympics
Equestrians at the 1995 Pan American Games
Pan American Games medalists in equestrian
Pan American Games silver medalists for Argentina
Place of birth missing (living people)
Medalists at the 1995 Pan American Games